Benjamin Evans (born 13 December 1986) is an English professional golfer who currently plays on the European Tour.

Education
Evans was educated at Claremont Preparatory School, St Leonards-on-Sea and then at Millfield School, Somerset (2000–04).

Professional career
Evans finished second at The Foshan Open in 2014. This result helped him to a 17th-place finish in the Order of Merit for the 2014 Challenge Tour that gave him conditional status on the European Tour.

In 2015, Evans finished 110th on the European Tour and thus retained full status for the 2016 season.  He initially was placed 111th and looked to have missed full status, but later gained full status for 2016 after Brooks Koepka relinquished his European Tour membership for 2016 and was removed from the rankings.

Amateur wins
2005 Faldo Series International Trophy
2006 Sunningdale Foursomes (with Danielle Masters), Faldo Series
2007 Faldo Series

Professional wins (1)

Alps Tour wins (1)

Team appearances
Amateur
 European Boys' Team Championship (representing England): 2004 (winners)

See also
2017 European Tour Qualifying School graduates
2018 European Tour Qualifying School graduates

References

External links

English male golfers
European Tour golfers
People educated at Millfield
People from Maidstone
People from Hastings
1986 births
Living people